Tafil Buzi (1792 - 1844) was an Albanian leader and fighter, known for his role in various rebellions against Ottoman government in South Albania during the Albanian Revolts of 1833-1839. During his activity he had relations with Muhammad Ali of Egypt and Greek politicians. For his continuous conspiracies he was captured and interned in 1840 by the Ottoman government. In 1842 he was pardoned and acted  leader in service of Ottoman government in Syria. He died there in 1844.

See also
 Andrea Manesi
 Abdyl bej Koka

References

1792 births
1844 deaths
People from Tepelenë